Japan, represented by Japanese Olympic Committee, competed at the 2012 Summer Olympics in London, from 27 July to 12 August 2012. Despite being London's third Olympic Games, Japan marked their London debut at this games. The nation also celebrated its centennial anniversary in the Olympics, having participated at every games since 1912 except for two editions; it was not invited to the 1948 Summer Olympics in London for its role in World War II, and was also part of the US-led boycott of the 1980 Summer Olympics in Moscow. Japan sent a total of 295 athletes to the Games, 138 men and 157 women, to compete in 24 sports.

Japan left London with a total of 38 medals (7 gold, 14 silver, and 17 bronze), finishing eleventh in the gold medal rankings and sixth in the overall medal rankings. This was also the nation's most successful Olympics, winning the largest number of medals in non-boycotted games. Eleven of these medals were awarded to the athletes in swimming, seven in judo, six in wrestling, and three in gymnastics. Five Japanese athletes won more than a single Olympic medal in London. With the absence of baseball and softball at the Olympics, Japan's team-based athletes proved successful in London, as women's football and women's volleyball teams won silver and bronze medals, respectively. For the first time since 1968, Japan had won two Olympic medals in men's boxing.

Among the nation's medalists were freestyle wrestlers Kaori Icho and Saori Yoshida, who successfully defended their Olympic titles in their respective events. Two-time Olympic silver medalist and gymnast Kōhei Uchimura won the coveted gold medal in individual all-around, becoming the fourth Japanese man to claim the title after 28 years. Meanwhile, Ryōta Murata became the first Japanese boxer to win an Olympic gold medal since 1960, in the men's middleweight division. Defending swimming champion Kosuke Kitajima, who aimed to win gold in two breaststroke events for third Games in succession, missed out on the medal standings in the finals.

Medalists
The following Japanese competitors won medals at the Games. In the by discipline sections below, medalists' names are bolded.

| width=78% align=left valign=top |

| width=22% align=left valign=top |

Delegation 
Japanese Olympic Committee (JOC) selected a team of 295 athletes, 138 men and 157 women, to compete in all sports except basketball, and handball; it was the nation's fifth-largest team sent to the Olympics, but the smallest since the 2000 Summer Olympics in Sydney. For the second time in its Olympic history, Japan was represented by more female than male athletes. There was only a single competitor in diving and in equestrian dressage.

The Japanese team included several past Olympic champions, three of them defending (freestyle wrestlers Kaori Icho and Saori Yoshida, and breaststroke swimmer Kosuke Kitajima). Yoshida, who won two consecutive gold medals in the Olympics before, became Japan's third female flag bearer at the opening ceremony since 2004, and the sixth in Olympic history. Javelin thrower and one-time world and Asian champion Yukifumi Murakami, on the other hand, served as the nation's team captain.

Dressage rider Hiroshi Hoketsu repeated his record from Beijing, as the oldest athlete to compete in these Olympic Games, at age 71. Single sculls rower Daisaku Takeda and show jumper Taizo Sugitani made their fifth appearance, having participated at every Olympic Games since 1996. Hammer thrower and former Olympic gold medalist Koji Murofushi, along with swimmer Kosuke Kitajima, was among the Japanese athletes who competed at their fourth Olympics. Meanwhile, breaststroke swimmer Kanako Watanabe, at age 15, was the youngest athlete of the team.

Other Japanese athletes featured gymnast and two-time Olympic silver medalist Kōhei Uchimura, javelin thrower and world junior champion Genki Dean, who embraced his British roots to represent the nation, table tennis player Ai Fukuhara, who became highly popular in China and Japan because of her nickname "China-dolls", and swimmers Ryosuke Irie and Takeshi Matsuda, who previously won the bronze medal in Beijing.

| width=78% align=left valign=top |
The following is the list of number of competitors participating in the Games. Note that reserves for fencing, field hockey, football, and handball are not counted as athletes:

Archery

Japan has qualified one archer for the men's individual event and one archer for the women's individual event

Men

Women

Athletics

Japanese athletes have so far achieved qualifying standards in the following athletics events (up to a maximum of 3 athletes in each event at the 'A' Standard, and 1 at the 'B' Standard):

Men
Track & road events

Field events

Combined events – Decathlon

Women
Track & road events

Field events

Badminton

Men

Women

Mixed

Boxing

Japan has so far qualified boxers for the following events

Men

Canoeing

Slalom
Japan has qualified boats for the following events

Sprint
Japan has qualified boats for the following events

Qualification Legend: FA = Qualify to final (medal); FB = Qualify to final B (non-medal)

Cycling

Japan had qualified the following cyclists for the Games.

Road

Track
Sprint

Team sprint

Keirin

Mountain biking

Diving

Japan has qualified in the following events.

Women

Equestrian

Currently, Japan has qualified eight athletes for the Games.

Dressage

Eventing

Show jumping

Fencing

Japan has qualified 8 fencers.

Men

Women

Field hockey

Japan has qualified 1 team.
 Women's event – 1 team of 16 players.

Women's tournament

Group play

9th/10th place

Football

Japan is qualified for the men's and women's event

 Men's team event – 1 team of 18 players
 Women's team event – 1 team of 18 players

Men's tournament

Squad

Group play

Quarter-final

Semi-final

Bronze medal game

Final rank 4th place.

Women's tournament

Squad

Group play

Quarter-final

Semi-final

Gold medal game

Gymnastics

Artistic
Men
Team

* On 30 July, Koji Yamamuro was injured on vault during the men's team final. It was announced that he would not compete in the individual all-around final as a result, and that his teammate, Kazuhito Tanaka would be able to compete instead.

Individual finals

Women
Team

Individual finals

Rhythmic

Trampoline

Judo

Men

Women

Modern pentathlon

Based on their results at the 2011 Asian/Oceania Championships three Japanese pentathletes have qualified for London; Shinichi Tomii has earned places in the men's event; Shino Yamanaka and Narumi Kurosu have earned places in the women's event.

Rowing

Japan has qualified the following boats.

Men

Women

Qualification Legend: FA=Final A (medal); FB=Final B (non-medal); FC=Final C (non-medal); FD=Final D (non-medal); FE=Final E (non-medal); FF=Final F (non-medal); SA/B=Semifinals A/B; SC/D=Semifinals C/D; SE/F=Semifinals E/F; QF=Quarterfinals; R=Repechage

Sailing

Japan has qualified 1 boat for each of the following events

Men

Women

Open

M = Medal race; EL = Eliminated – did not advance into the medal race;

Shooting

Japan has gained four quota places in the shooting events;

Men

Women

Swimming

Japan sent a total of 29 swimmers at the London games, after having achieved qualifying standards in their respective events (up to a maximum of 2 swimmers in each event at the Olympic Qualifying Time (OQT), and 1 at the Olympic Selection Time (OST)): Excluding the relay events, eight swimmers competed in more than a single event, including the defending champion Kosuke Kitajima from the breaststroke events.

By results, Japan left London with 11 swimming medals (3 silver and 8 bronze), the largest amount received at a single event. Backstroke swimmer Ryosuke Irie, and breaststroke swimmer Satomi Suzuki managed to win three medals in all of their respective events, whether individual or relay. Kosuke Hagino, the youngest male swimmer in the team, surprisingly won the bronze medal in the men's 400 m individual medley, surpassing all-time defending champion Michael Phelps, who finished behind him in the finals. Butterfly swimmer Takeshi Matsuda managed to repeat his bronze medal from Beijing in the men's 200 m butterfly, in addition to his silver from the men's medley relay event. Kitajima, who bid to win double breaststroke swimming events for third Games in succession, missed out of medal standings in the final rounds.

Men

Women

WSO – Win swim-off; LSO – Lost swim-off

Synchronized swimming

Japan has qualified 9 quota places in synchronized swimming.

Table tennis

Japan has qualified 3 men and 3 women.

Men

Women

Taekwondo

Japan has qualified the following quotas.

Tennis

Triathlon

Japan has qualified 2 men and 3 women.

Volleyball

Beach

The men's team qualified after winning the AVC Continental Beach Volleyball Cup.

Indoor

Women's tournament

Japan has qualified a team to the women's indoor tournament through the World Qualification Tournament.
 Women's team event – 1 team of 12 players

Team roster

Group play

Quarter-final

Semi-final

Bronze medal match

Weightlifting

Japan has qualified 1 man and 4 women.

Wrestling

Japan has qualified in the following quota places.

Men's freestyle

Men's Greco-Roman

Women's freestyle

See also
 Japan at the Olympics
 Japan at the 2012 Summer Paralympics

References

Nations at the 2012 Summer Olympics
2012
Summer Olympics